Séverine is a feminine given name.

People with the name
Notable people with the name include:

 Séverine Amiot (born 1979), French paracanoer
 Séverine Beltrame (born 1979), French tennis player
 Séverine Caneele (born 1974), Belgian film actress
 Séverine Ferrer (born 1977), French singer
 Séverine Loyau (born 1973), French sprint canoer
 Séverine Pont-Combe (born 1979), Swiss ski mountaineer and long distance runner
 Séverine Vandenhende (born 1974), French judoka

People with the nickname or pen name
 Caroline Rémy de Guebhard (1855–1929), pen name Séverine, French socialist, journalist, and feminist
 Séverine (singer) (Josiane Grizeau, born 1948), French singer

Fictional characters
 Sévérine, a fictional character in the 2012 James Bond film Skyfall
 Séverine Serizy, played by Catherine Deneuve, in Luis Buñuel's 1967 Belle de Jour 
Séverine Roubaud, in La Bête Humaine, a 1938 French film

See also

French feminine given names